Kerala Agricultural University (KAU) is a state university for agricultural education, recognised as a State Agricultural University (SAU) by the Indian Council of Agricultural Research (ICAR). It is situated in Vellanikkara, Kerala, India. Ishita Roy IAS is the Vice-Chancellor (i/c) and Dr. A. Sakeer Husain is the Registrar (i/c)

The KAU is the primary and the principal instrumentality of the Kerala State in providing human resources, and skills and technology, required for the sustainable development of its Agriculture, defined broadly encompassing all production activities based on land and water, including crop production, forestry and co-operatives by conducting, interfacing and integrating education, research and extension in these spheres of economic endeavour.

History

On the recommendation of the Kothari Commission (1964-1966), one Agricultural University was to be established in each state. Kerala Agricultural University (KAU) was established on 24 February 1971 by the Act 33 of 1971 and began functioning on 1 February 1972. In accordance with the KAU Act of 1971, the College of Agriculture, Vellayani and the College of Veterinary and Animal Sciences, Mannuthy were brought under Kerala Agricultural University, in addition, 21 agricultural and animal husbandry research stations were also transferred to KAU. In 2011, Kerala Agricultural University was trifurcated into Kerala Veterinary and Animal Sciences University (KVASU), Kerala University of Fisheries and Ocean Studies (KUFOS) and Kerala Agricultural University (KAU).

Faculties 

For each degree, its respective faculty also offer specialized concentrations

Faculty of Agriculture 
Degrees offered:

Biotechnology: B Tech
Agriculture: Diploma, BSc, MSc & PhD
Horticulture: MSc
Food Science & Nutrition: MSc & PhD
Agricultural Statistics: MSc
Agricultural Biotechnology: MSc, IMSc & PhD
Climate Change Adaptation: IMSc
Co-operation & Banking: BSc, MSc & PhD
Agri Business Management: MBA

Faculty of Forestry 
Degrees offered:
Forestry: BSc, MSc & PhD

Faculty of Agricultural Engineering & Technology 
Degree offered:

Agricultural Engineering: BTech, MTech, PhD
Food Technology: BTech

Faculty of Fisheries 
Delinked from KAU in 2010 to form separate University-KUFOS 

The Governor of Kerala and Chancellor of Kerala Agricultural University (KAU) has accorded assent to the proposal to establish a full-fledged Faculty of Forestry at Vellanikkara. Forestry will be the third faculty under KAU after Agriculture and Agricultural Engineering. Two other faculties,  viz.  Veterinary and Fisheries were delinked from KAU in 2010 to form separate Universities.

Institutions
The institutions under Kerala Agricultural University are.

Agriculture and Forestry 
 CoA Vellanikkara,Thrissur
 CoA Vellayani, Thiruvananthapuram
 CoA Padannakkad, Kasaragod
 CoA Ambalavayal, Wayanad
CoF Vellanikkara, Thrissur

Management
CoCBM KAU Campus, Thrissur

Climate Studies 
 CoCCES Vellanikkara, Thrissur

Agricultural Engineering & Technology 
KCAET Tavanur, Malappuram

Diploma Course
RARS Pattambi

Veterinary and Animal Science

Delinked from KAU in 2010 to form separate University-KVASU
CVAS Mannuthy, Thrissur
CVAS Pookkot, Wayanad
CoF Ernakulam (KUFOS)

Research Stations 
Northern Zone
PRS Panniyur, Kannur
RARS Pilicode, Kasaragod

High Range Zone
CRS, Pampadumpara, Idukki
RARS Ambalavayal, Wayanad

Central Zone 
ARS Chalakudy, Thrissur
ARS Mannuthy, Thrissur
AMPRS Odakkali, Ernakulam
RARS Pattambi, Palakkad
BRS Kannara, Thrissur
CRS Madakkathara, Thrissur
CRS Anakkayam, Malappuram
PRS Vazhakulam, Muvattupuzha, Ernakulam
PPNM KAU Campus, Thrissur

Special Zone of Problem Areas
ADS Karumady, Alappuzha
RARS Kumarakom, Kottayam
RRS Vyttila, Kochi
RRS Monncombu, Alappuzha
SRS Pulikeezhu, Pathanamthitta

Onattukara Zone
RARS Kayamkulam, Alappuzha

Southern Zone
CSRC Karamana, Thiruvananthapuram
CRS Balaramapuram, Thiruvananthapuram
FSRS Sadanandapuram, Kottarakkara, Kollam
RARS Vellayani, Thiruvananthapuram
SCRC Konni, Pathanamthitta

Training & Extension Centres 
AITC Mannuthy, Thrissur
CC Mannuthy, Thrissur
CTI Mannuthy, Thrissur
ISC Mannuthy, Thrissur
KVK Sadananthapuram, Kollam
KVK Pattambi, Palakkad
KVK Ambalavayal, Wayanad
KVK KAU Campus, Thrissur
KVK Kumarakom, Kottayam
KVK Kannur
KVK Tavanur, Malappuram

Research Centres 
Delinked from KAU in 2010 to form separate University-KVASU [6]
 Livestock Research Cetre, Thiruvazhamkunnu

Notable alumni
 Jacob Thomas (police officer), Former DGP State of Kerala
 Joe Paul (lyricist), Indian Lyricist & Music Composer
 Anuja Akathoottu, Researcher, Scientist

References

External links 

Kerala Agricultural University Official Website

Universities and colleges in Thrissur
Agricultural universities and colleges in Kerala
Forestry education in India
1971 establishments in Kerala
Educational institutions established in 1971
Universities in Kerala